Gangamma Circle is a small area located in Bangalore city, the capital of Karnataka state in India. 
The place is well known for its religious establishments like St. Mary's Orthodox Valiyapally, Ebenezer Marthoma Church, St. Joseph's ITI Our Lady of Fátima Church, Gangamma temple, residential areas like Prestige Wellington Apartments and Kalathur Layout that includes the main Panakal Family Home, and has also been a fast developing business center with an increasing population over the last three decades.
It is situated along the Indian Airforce (IAF) Main Road, near M.S. Palya.

Related areas
The place is also known for being the junction that connects the roads to Air Force station Jalahalli East, Air Force station Jalahalli West, K G halli, Dasarahalli, M.S. Palya and Yelahanka. The place is also where the main Panakal Family Home is located that has been there for multiple decades, becoming a famous attraction in the area.

Religious establishments
St. Mary's Orthodox Valiyapally (Malankara Orthodox Syrian Church) 
St. Joseph ITI Our Lady of Fatima Church (Catholic Church)
Ebenezer Marthoma Church (Marthoma Church)
St. Antony's Church (Catholic Church)
Christ the King Church (Pentecostal Church)
Gangamma temple
Masjid-e-yaseen
El-Olam Ministries
Siloam brethren church
Telugu Baptist Church

Educational institutions
Cluny Convent School
St. Mary's Nursery School (run by St Mary's Orthodox Valiyapally)
St. Michael's English School
Kendriya Vidyalaya No.2, Jalahalli East,Bangalore
Good Shepherd Playschool
Fathima high school

References

Neighbourhoods in Bangalore